On Floating Bodies is a Greek-language work consisting of two books written by Archimedes of Syracuse (287 – c. 212 BC), one of the most important mathematicians, physicists, and engineers of antiquity. On Floating Bodies, which is thought to have been written around 250 BC, survives only partly in Greek, the rest in medieval Latin translation from the Greek. It is the first known work on hydrostatics, of which Archimedes is recognized as the founder.

The purpose of On Floating Bodies was to determine the positions that various solids will assume when floating in a fluid, according to their form and the variation in their specific gravities. It contains the first statement of what is now known as Archimedes' principle.

Overview
Archimedes lived in the Greek city-state of Syracuse, Sicily. He is credited with laying the foundations of hydrostatics (which he established in On Floating Bodies), statics and calculating the underlying mathematics of the lever. A leading scientist of classical antiquity, Archimedes also developed elaborate systems of pulleys to move large objects with a minimum of effort. The Archimedes' screw underpins modern hydroengineering, and his machines of war helped to hold back the armies of Rome in the Second Punic War. Archimedes opposed the arguments of Aristotle, pointing out that it was impossible to separate mathematics and nature and proved it by converting mathematical theories into practical inventions.

The only known copy of "On Floating Bodies" in Greek comes from the Archimedes Palimpsest.

Contents

First book
In the first part of the treatise, Archimedes establishes various general principles, such as that a solid denser than a fluid will, when immersed in that fluid, be lighter (this "missing" weight is found in the fluid it displaces). Archimedes spells out the law of equilibrium of fluids, and proves that water will adopt a spherical form around a center of gravity. This may have been an attempt at explaining the theory of contemporary Greek astronomers such as Eratosthenes that the Earth is round. The fluids described by Archimedes are not self-gravitating, since he assumes the existence of a point towards which all things fall in order to derive the spherical shape. Most notably, On Floating Bodies contains the concept which became known as Archimedes' principle:

As well as the principle that bears his name, Archimedes discovered that a submerged object displaces a volume of water equal to the object's own volume (upon which it is said he shouted "Eureka"). Further, Proposition 5 of Archimedes' treatise On Floating Bodies states that:

This concept has come to be referred to by some as the principle of flotation.

Second book
The second book is a mathematical achievement unmatched in antiquity and rarely equaled since. Heath called it "a veritable tour de force which must be read in full to be appreciated." The book contains a detailed investigation of the stable equilibrium positions of floating right paraboloids of various shapes and relative densities, when floating in a fluid of greater specific gravity, according to geometric and hydrostatic variations. It is restricted to the case when the base of the paraboloid lies either entirely above or entirely below the fluid surface. Archimedes' investigation of paraboloids was probably an idealization of the shapes of ships' hulls. Some of his sections float with the base under water and the summit above water, similar to the way that icebergs float. Of his works that survive, the second of his two books of On Floating Bodies is considered his most mature work, commonly described as a tour de force.

References

External links
Greek text hosted by SLUB (Saxon State and University Library Dresden)
Greek text hosted by Poesia Latina
The Medieval Latin Translation by William of Moerbeke edited by Johan Heiberg
English translation by Thomas Little Heath

Works by Archimedes
3rd-century BC books
Papyrology